Leticia ("Tish") Hinojosa (born December 6, 1955, San Antonio, Texas) is a folksinger recording in both Spanish and English. Hinojosa was the youngest of 13 children. Hinojosa's parents were Mexican immigrants.  Known for singing both traditional Mexican folksongs and her own original songs, both in Spanish and English, Hinojosa accompanies herself on guitar, which she plays right-handed although she is naturally lefthanded. Influenced by traditional Mexican, folk, Tejano, conjunto, and country musics, Hinojosa considers her music to be music of the US/Mexico border.

Hinojosa has recorded numerous albums and has charted twice on the Billboard country charts.  Her 1992 album Culture Swing won the National Association of Independent Record Distributors (NAIRD) Indie Folk Album of the Year.

Using music to bring awareness to cultural issues, Hinojosa hopes to bring into focus the plight of migrant workers and children of the poor. Additionally, she often performs children's music of her culture to help children develop an understanding of the Southwest's Hispanic traditions.

As of 2021, Hinajosa lives in both Austin, Texas and Tubac, Arizona.  In the 1970s and 1980s she also lived in Taos, New Mexico and Nashville, Tennessee.  In 2005, Hinojosa moved to Germany, and in 2013 returned to Austin.

Career highlights

Awards and honors
 White House performance for President Bill and Hillary Clinton
 NAIRD Indie Folk Album of the Year Culture Swing
 Las Primera (The Firsts) award from MANA, the largest organization of Latino women
 Performances at presidential and gubernatorial inauguration events.

Television
 VH 1
 ABC-TV special: Alma Awards
 MTV
 The Nashville Network
 Austin City Limits (three separate appearances)
 Fox Television Bravo Awards
 Good Morning America
 Onyx TV Germany
 WDR TV Germany
 SWR TV Switzerland
 VPRO TV Netherlands

Humanitarian activities
 Spokesperson, National Latino Children's Agenda
 Spokesperson, National Assoc. Of Bilingual Education
 United Farm Workers of America

Discography

Albums

Self
1987 Taos to Tennessee, Self-release; re-released 1992; 
1989 Homeland, Fonatana A&M Records, re-released 2006? w/ bonus track 
1990, 1991 Memorabilia Navideña, EP: self released cassette; Watermelon Records re-released CD 1992
1991 Aquella Noche, Watermelon Records
1992 Culture Swing, Rounder Records
1994 Destiny's Gate, Warner Bros. Records
1995 Frontejas, Rounder Records
1996 Cada Niño/Every Child, Rounder Records
1996 Dreaming From The Labyrinth/Soñar del Laberinto, Warner Bros. Records
1996 Soñar del Laberinto, Warner Bros. Records
1997 The Best of the Sandia: Watermelon 1991–1992, Rounder Records compilation
1998 ...a Music and Information Digest, Warner Bros. Records promotion-only CD
2000 Sign of Truth, Rounder Records, Rounder Records
2003 Best of Tish Hinojosa – Live, Rounder Records
2003 From Texas for a Christmas Night re-release of 1990-1991 Memorabilia Navideña, with five additional newly-recorded songs; Lone Star Records/Texas Music Group
2005 A Heart Wide Open, Valley Entertainment
2006 Retrospective, Varèse Sarabande
2008 Our Little Planet, CRS (Varèse Sarabande)
2013 After the Fair, Varèse Sarabande
2018 West, Tish Records
2019 My Homeland, Tish Records

The Texicana Mamas (Patricia Vonne, Tish Hinojosa, Stephanie Urbina Jones)
2020 The Texicana Mamas, self-released, internet only

Singles

Music videos

Bibliography 
 Hinojosa, Tish, and Lucia Angela Perez. 2002. Cada Niño = Every Child : A Bilingual Songbook for Kids. El Paso, Tex. : Cinco Puntos Press, 2002.

See also
 Music of Austin

References

Further reading and listening
Ragland, Cathy, "South Texas culture: Austin's Tish Hinojosa has made the jump to a major label", Folk Roots; Nov. 1994, pp. 42–43
Dexter, Kerry, “A Home in Music." Dirty Linen: Folk & World Music, no. 141 (May 2009): 24–27.
Hansen, Liane. "Interview: Tish Hinojosa, Singer-Songwriter, Discusses Her Life, Music and New CD". 2000. National Public Radio.
Rodemann, Katharyn. 2005. "Tish Hinojosa." Texas Monthly 33 (12): 124–26.

External links

AllMusic

1955 births
American women singers
Living people
Musicians from San Antonio
Country musicians from Texas
American musicians of Mexican descent
American women country singers
American country singer-songwriters
A&M Records artists
Curb Records artists
Singer-songwriters from Texas
Hispanic and Latino American musicians
Rounder Records artists
Varèse Sarabande artists
Warner Records artists
Hispanic and Latino American women singers
21st-century American women